Bridwell Peak is a peak,  high,  southeast of Boss Peak in the Victory Mountains of Victoria Land, Antarctica. It was mapped by the United States Geological Survey from surveys and from U.S. Navy aerial photographs, 1960–63, and named by the Advisory Committee on Antarctic Names for Ray E. Bridwell, a United States Antarctic Research Program meteorologist at Hallett Station, 1964–65.

References
 

Mountains of Victoria Land
Borchgrevink Coast